Ogyris idmo, the large brown azure, is a butterfly in the family Lycaenidae. It is found in Australia, where it is found in Victoria, South Australia and southern Western Australia.

The wingspan is about 50 mm. The upper surface of the wings of the males is dark purple with narrow dark margins. The female is bright iridescent blue with broad black margins and a white spot near the tip of the forewing. The underside of both sexes is pale brown.

The larvae live in the nest of various sugar ant species, including Camponotus nigriceps and Camponotus terebrans. They possibly feed on the immature ants. They are off white, with a dark head. Pupation takes place in the ants nest.

Subspecies
 Ogyris idmo idmo (Western Australia)
 Ogyris idmo halmaturia Tepper, 1890 (Kangaroo Island)
 Ogyris idmo waterhouseri Bethune-Baker, 1905 (western Victoria)

References

Butterflies described in 1862
Arhopalini
Butterflies of Australia